Hugo Hawksley Fitzthomas Summerson (born 21 July 1950) is a British Conservative politician.

Early life
Summerson contested Barking in 1983, but was beaten by Labour's Jo Richardson by 4,026 votes.

Parliamentary career
At the 1987 general election, Summerson was elected Member of Parliament for Walthamstow, gaining 39% of the vote and ousting the Labour incumbent Eric Deakins. This was against the pro-Labour national swing but broadly in line with the swing elsewhere in Greater London which was pro-Conservative.

His maiden speech was made on 4 November 1987, during the second reading of Urban Development Corporations (Financial Limits) Bill. He used the opportunity to extol the virtues of his constituency: "My constituency is Walthamstow. I have found that many people do not know exactly where Walthamstow is. I recommend that they get on the Victoria line northbound and stay on the train until it stops and they will find themselves in Walthamstow. It is an area with a very interesting history."

Summerson lost the seat at the 1992 general election to the Labour candidate Neil Gerrard, who received 45.7% of the vote. By contrast, Summerson received 37.2% of the vote.

References 

Other sources
Times Guide to the House of Commons, 1992

External links 
 

1950 births
Living people
Conservative Party (UK) MPs for English constituencies
UK MPs 1987–1992